Móra d'Ebre is the capital of the comarca of the Ribera d'Ebre in Catalonia, 
Spain. It is situated on the right bank of the Ebre river in the Móra Hollow, and is served by the N-420 road 
to Reus and Gandesa, the N-230 road to Lleida. The RENFE railway line between Tarragona and Saragossa 
runs along the left bank of the river, with a station at Móra la Nova opposite the urban centre of Móra d'Ebre.

History
The most ancient settlements in the area date to 4th millennium BC, to the Neolithic . Later the Iberians lived here until the Roman conquest.

The area was reconquered from the Moors in 1153, by count Ramon Berenguer IV of Barcelona. Later the town became part of the Barony of Entença.
The baronial castle of Móra d'Ebre is located on a hill overlooking the river and the town. It is now in a state of semi-ruin, for it was used as a fortress during the Spanish Civil War and was heavily shelled and bombed. Nowadays some reconstruction has taken place in the western side. Many of the houses of the town are also in a ruinous state and reconstruction has only been haphazard.

Notable locals
 Ernesto Domínguez, Spanish international footballer.
 Ton Alcover, footballer

See also
La Picossa (Móra d'Ebre)

References 

 Panareda Clopés, Josep Maria; Rios Calvet, Jaume; Rabella Vives, Josep Maria (1989). Guia de Catalunya, Barcelona: Caixa de Catalunya.  (Spanish).  (Catalan).

External links
Official website
 Government data pages 

Municipalities in Ribera d'Ebre
Populated places in Ribera d'Ebre